Matthew Herbert Dorsett (born August 23, 1973) was an American football cornerback in the National Football League. Dorsett signed as a free agent with the Green Bay Packers. Dorsett was highly touted for his bump and run coverage abilities. Dorsett garnered the nickname "Baby Time" for his tenacious bump and run coverage. Dorsett was one of only two players in Green Bay history to make the 53 man roster as a free agent.

American football cornerbacks
Southern Jaguars football players
Green Bay Packers players
Nashville Kats players
1973 births
Living people